IJscolf was a sport played on ice, popular in the Low Countries between the Middle Ages and the Dutch Golden Age. It was similar to ice hockey, although there is no evidence that ice hockey was directly influenced by the IJscolf.

External link

Winter sports in Europe